Cartersville is a city in Bartow County, Georgia, United States; it is located within the northwest edge of the Atlanta metropolitan area. As of the 2020 census, the city had a population of 23,187. Cartersville is the county seat of Bartow County.

History
Cartersville, originally known as Birmingham, was founded by English-Americans in 1832. The town was incorporated as Cartersville in 1854. The present name is for Col. Farish Carter of Milledgeville, the owner of a large plantation. Cartersville was the long-time home of Amos Akerman, U.S. Attorney General under President Ulysses S. Grant; in that office he spearheaded the federal prosecution of members of the Ku Klux Klan and was one of the most important public servants of the Reconstruction era.

Cartersville was designated the seat of Bartow County in 1867 following the destruction of Cassville by Sherman in the American Civil War. Cartersville was incorporated as a city in 1872.

On February 26, 1916 a group of one hundred men and boys took Jesse McCorkle from the jail and hanged him from a tree in front of the city hall and riddled his body with bullets.

Geography

The Etowah River flows through a broad valley south of the downtown, leading west to Rome, where it forms the Coosa River, a tributary of the Alabama River. The city limits extend eastward, upriver, as far as Allatoona Dam, which forms Lake Allatoona, a large U.S. Army Corps of Engineers reservoir. Red Top Mountain State Park sits on a peninsula in the lake, just outside the city limits. Nancy Creek also flows in the vicinity.

Transportation
Interstate 75, the major north-south route through the area, passes through the eastern edge of the city, with access from five exits: Exit 285 just south of the city limits in Emerson, Exit 288 (East Main Street) closest to downtown, and exits 290, 293, and 296 along the city's northern outskirts. U.S. Highway 41, which is concurrent with State Route 3, is an older, parallel highway to Interstate 75 that goes through the eastern edge of downtown, leading north to Calhoun and Dalton and south to Marietta. U.S. Highway 411 passes through the northern edge of the city, leading west to Rome and north to Chatsworth. State Route 20 runs west to Rome concurrent with U.S. Highway 411 and runs east to Canton. State Route 61 runs north to White concurrent with U.S. Highway 411 and runs south to Dallas, Georgia. State Route 113 runs southwesterly to Rockmart. State Route 293 runs west-northwest to Kingston.

Cartersville Airport is a public use airport located in the west side of Cartersville on State Route 61. It is the home base of Phoenix Air.

Cartersville area communities
The following communities border the city:
 Adairsville (north-northwest)
 Cassville (north)
 Emerson (south)
 Euharlee (west)
 Kingston (northwest)
 Stilesboro (southwest)
 White (northern)
 Grassdale Road (west)

Climate

Demographics

2020 census

As of the 2020 United States census, there were 23,187 people, 7,835 households, and 5,285 families residing in the city.

2010 census
As of the census of 2010, there were 19,010 people, 5,870 households, and 4,132 families residing in the city. The population of Cartersville is growing significantly. The racial makeup of the city was 63.93% White, 29.64% African American, 0.82% Asian, 0.28% Native American, 0.04% Pacific Islander, 3.76% from other races, and 1.53% from two or more races. Hispanic or Latino people of any race were 7.28% of the population.

There were 5,870 households, out of which 33.3% had children under the age of 18 living with them, 52.6% were married couples living together, 13.6% had a female householder with no husband present, and 29.6% were non-families. 25.9% of all households were made up of individuals, and 11.7% had someone living alone who was 65 years of age or older.  The average household size was 2.59 and the average family size was 3.10.

In the city, the population was spread out, with 25.9% under the age of 18, 8.7% from 18 to 24, 30.2% from 25 to 44, 20.8% from 45 to 64, and 14.4% who were 65 years of age or older.  The median age was 36 years. For every 100 females, there were 95.4 males.  For every 100 females age 18 and over, there were 92.1 males.

The median income for a household in the city was $41,162, and the median income for a family was $48,219. Males had a median income of $35,092 versus $25,761 for females. The per capita income for the city was $19,977.  About 8.9% of families and 11.4% of the population were below the poverty line, including 13.7% of those under age 18 and 15.4% of those age 65 or over.

Points of interest

 The Booth Western Art Museum is on North Museum Drive in Cartersville. The Booth is the second-largest art museum in Georgia, and houses the largest permanent exhibition space for Western art in the country. It is a Smithsonian Institution Affiliate.
 The Etowah Indian Mounds is an archaeological Native American site in Bartow County, south of Cartersville.
 Tellus Science Museum, formerly the Weinman Mineral Museum, is a Smithsonian Institution Affiliate and features the first digital planetarium in North Georgia. NASA has installed a camera that tracks meteors at the museum.
 The world's first outdoor Coca-Cola sign, painted in 1894, is located in downtown Cartersville on Young Brothers Pharmacy's wall.
 Rose Lawn, a house museum, is the former home of noted evangelist Samuel Porter Jones, for whom the Union Gospel Tabernacle (Ryman Auditorium) in Nashville was built, later to become the Grand Ole Opry.
 The Bartow History Museum is located in the Old Cartersville Courthouse, c. 1870, in downtown Cartersville on East Church Street.
 Savoy Automobile Museum is a museum displaying a diverse collection of automobiles and original works of art. 
 The Pine Mountain Recreation Area trails ascend to a summit at 1562 feet overlooking Cartersville. Atlanta & Allatoona Lake can also be seen from the summit. The trails are maintained by City of Cartersville Parks & Recreation.

Education
The schools that comprise the Cartersville City School System are:

 Cartersville Primary School
 Cartersville Elementary School
 Cartersville Middle School
 Cartersville High School

There is also a private Montessori school:
Lifesong Montessori School

Cartersville also has a college campus:

 Georgia Highlands College

Economy
Manufacturing, tourism, and services play a part in the economy of the city. The city's employers include:

 Anheuser-Busch
 Georgia Power
 Komatsu
 Shaw Industries, a major flooring manufacturer
 Phoenix Air is based in the Cartersville Airport.

The city is home to Piedmont Cartersville Medical Center and The Hope Center, making it a minor healthcare hub for the surrounding area.

Law enforcement
In 2017, the Cartersville Police Department arrested 65 people at a house party because of a suspicion that there was an ounce of marijuana at the party. In 2022, a federal court awarded 45 of the arrested individuals a $900,000 settlement due to a violation of their constitutional rights.On September 8 2022, Deputy Police Chief Jason DiPrima resigned after being arrested in a prostitute police-sting operation.

Notable people

 Amos Akerman  (February 23, 1821 – December 21, 1880) was an American politician who served as United States Attorney General under President Ulysses S. Grant from 1870 to 1871.
 Bill Arp (Charles Henry Smith; 1826–1903), nationally syndicated columnist
 Robert Benham, the first African-American Georgia Supreme Court justice
 Ronnie Brown, National Football League (NFL) running back
 Bob Burns (1950–2015), founding member and original drummer of Lynyrd Skynyrd
 Rebecca Latimer Felton (1835–1930), the first female United States Senator
 Andre Fluellen, NFL defensive tackle
 W. J. Gordy, potter
 A. O. Granger (1846–1914), industrialist and founder of the Etowah Iron Company
 Corra Harris, author
 Joe Frank Harris (1936–), former governor of Georgia
 Keith Henderson, former NFL running back
 Sam Howard professional baseball player for the Pittsburgh Pirates
 Matthew Johnson Republican politician, former Alabama State Representative, television personality for Fox News Channel
 Samuel Porter Jones (1847–1906), evangelist
 Cledus T. Judd, country music singer
 Wayne Knight (1955–), actor 
 Trevor Lawrence, quarterback at Cartersville High School (2014-2018), Clemson University (2018–2021) and the Jacksonville Jaguars.
 Robert Lavette, professional football player
 Lottie Moon, Baptist missionary to China
 Chloë Grace Moretz, actress and model
 Donavan Tate, third overall pick in the 2009 Major League Baseball draft by the San Diego Padres 
 Mark Thompson, NASCAR driver
 Benjamin Walker, actor
 Butch Walker (1969–), singer-songwriter and producer
 Hedy West (1938–2005), folk singer and songwriter
 Rudy York (1913–1970), professional baseball player

References

External links

  The City of Cartersville launched a brand new, sleek, outside-of-the-box website June 14, 2021.
My Cartersville & My Cartersville App for citizens and visitors of Cartersville
Cartersville Airport
 Cartersville at New Georgia Encyclopedia
 Cartersville-Bartow County Convention & Visitors Bureau
 Cartersville-Bartow County Chamber of Commerce
 The Daily Tribune, newspaper based in Cartersville
 News Talk AM 1270, radio station based in Cartersville

Cities in Bartow County, Georgia
Cities in Georgia (U.S. state)
County seats in Georgia (U.S. state)